The Boy Band Con: The Lou Pearlman Story is an American documentary film that premiered on March 13, 2019 at SXSW. Produced by Lance Bass, the film explores the career and legacy of record producer and convicted criminal Lou Pearlman.

Premise
The Boy Band Con: The Lou Pearlman Story features "the story of Lou Pearlman, his remarkable successes and offenses, and his tragic end while serving a 25-year prison sentence for multiple felony convictions. The Lou Pearlman Project reveals the dark side of stardom and the music industry as members of multi-platinum-selling bands like *NSYNC, Backstreet Boys, O-Town, Innosense, Take 5 and C-Note tell all about working with Pearlman."

Persons featured
The documentary includes interviews with: 

 AJ McLean (Backstreet Boys)
 Ashley Parker Angel (O-Town)
 Aaron Carter
 JC Chasez (*NSYNC)
 Chris Kirkpatrick (*NSYNC)
 Lance Bass (*NSYNC)
 Nikki DeLoach (Innosense)
 David Perez (C-Note)
 Tim "TJ" Christofore (Take 5)
 Diane Bass (Mother of Lance Bass)
 Lynn Bomar Harless (Mother of Justin Timberlake (*NSYNC))

Production
On April 24, 2018, it was announced that YouTube Red was in production on The Lou Pearlman Project, a documentary executive produced by Lance Bass, Craig Piligian, Nicholas Caprio, and Sam Korkis. The documentary was set to feature interviews with AJ McLean, Ashley Parker Angel, Aaron Carter, JC Chasez, Chris Kirkpatrick, Lance Bass, Diane Bass, and Lynn Bomar Harless. Production companies involved with the film were slated to consist of Pilgrim Media Group.

Release
The film held its world premiere at the Paramount Theatre in Austin, Texas on March 13, 2019 during the South by Southwest film festival as part of the "24 Beats Per Second" series of screenings.

References

2019 films
Documentary films about singers
American documentary films
Documentary films about the music industry
Fox Searchlight Pictures films
Lou Pearlman
2010s English-language films
2010s American films